Cyprinus carpio carpio is a subspecies of the common carp that is commonly found in Europe. They are native to much of Europe (notably the Danube and Volga Rivers) and can also be found in the Caucasus and Central Asia. Mitochondrial DNA analysis shows a difference between C. carpio carpio and Carpio carpio haematopterus. They are omnivorous in nature and feed on mollusks, insects, crustaceans and seeds. Though dark in color, there are some wild caught specimens which are colored orange (maybe domesticated ones that are only released into the rivers). This subspecies has also been domesticated in European ponds for hundreds of years. They are considered as an invasive species in the state of Washington and fishing them is encouraged to diminish their population.

References

Taxa named by Carl Linnaeus
Cyprinid fish of Europe
Cyprinid fish of Asia